The Terminal Inspection Act of 1916 was a part of the Rural Post Roads Act of 1916. It prohibited a person from sending through the U.S. mail to a state address a package containing a plant or plant product unless the package's contents are plainly marked.

1916 in American law
United States federal postal legislation